Blackbird (formerly named FORscene) is an integrated internet video platform, video editing software, covering non-linear editing and publishing for broadcast, web and mobile.

Designed by Blackbird plc to allow collaborative editing of video at resolutions of up to 540p and up to 60 frames per second on bandwidths as low as 2MBit/s, it is capable of video logging, reviewing, publishing and hosting through HD and 4K to UHD quality from original sources. The system is implemented as a mobile app for Android and iOS devices, a Java applet and a pure JavaScript web application as part of its user interface. The latter runs on platforms without application installation, codec installation, or machine configuration and has Web 2.0 features.

Blackbird won the Royal Television Society's award for Technology in the post-production process in December 2005.

Usage 

The Blackbird platform's functionality makes it suitable for multiple uses in the video editing workflow.

For editors and producers wanting to produce broadcast-quality output, Blackbird provides an environment for the early stages of post-production to happen remotely and cheaply (logging, shot selection, collaborative reviewing, rough cutting and offline editing, for example) and more recently fine cut editing. Blackbird then outputs instructions in standard formats which can be applied to the high-quality master-footage for detailed and high-quality editing prior to broadcast.

Other users want to prepare footage for publishing to lower-quality media - the small screens of mobile phones and video iPods, and to the web where bandwidth restricts the quality of video it is currently practical to output. For these users, all editing can be carried out in Blackbird, before publishing to social media and online video channels, OTT or commercial cloud storage. Video can also be saved in MPEG, Ogg, HTML5, podcasting formats as well as Blackbird's proprietary player.

The platform was reported in July 2012 as being used by NBC in connection with the 2012 Summer Olympics involving integration of the service with YouTube and continues to be used to deliver coverage for sport events such as Formula One, PGA European Tour and the Premier League.
§

Services 
The video platform is referred to broadly as Blackbird and marketed as three distinct B2B products:
 Edge
 Ascent
 Forte
All exploit the cloud for delivery. Integrations to third parties provide additional services (for example graphics, CC, transcription) and workflow (such as to other NLE systems).

Blackbird Ascent and Blackbird Forte 
Ascent and Forte enable functionality including: video logging, frame accurate non-linear editing (and multicam support for up to 18 cameras), reviewing, publishing, storyboarding and clipping. Ascent is designed for workflows that require a subset of Forte's features.

Blackbird Edge server 
The Blackbird Edge server is a gateway between content and the Blackbird platform. Clients may elect to use a single physical Edge server per fixed or remote location to scale up operations and improve overall performance (e.g. the time taken to retrieve video for review). Features may vary based on workflow / infrastructure requirement but include:
Live and non-live Content ingest
Local caching of video downloads
Immediate access of video over a Local Area Network (LAN) during upload
Seamless transfer of video as required between a Blackbird Edge Server and the Blackbird Infrastructure
The product exploits high speed LAN access whilst preserving the principle of access from anywhere. Deployment may be on-premise, on-location, or to public / private cloud. Linux and macOS supported. Logging, editing and reviewing of uploaded material can start as soon as the upload process starts. Files containing video, audio and still may also be picked and uploaded using a web browser for ingest.

Blackbird Player 
The Blackbird Player supports; renderless publishing, multiple layers, own branding, clipping and URL sharing, ability to revoke access and a patented navigation bar. The Blackbird decoder is packaged in libraries for native mobile apps, applets and a pure JavaScript player.

Components 

The Blackbird platform is made up of various components, discussed here.

Platform servers
The server infrastructure on the Blackbird backbone network (referred to as the cloud) dedicated to Blackbird's customers are distributed over numerous locations and handle around 10,000 hours of new video content each week. These act as one system, increasing both effective capacity and redundancy. As the front end does most of the work during editing, and the upload software does the compression work, the server is lightly loaded and can support many users at the same time. Sites may also attach a server to their own network (Edge) for improved performance/scalability (local ingest and caching to multiply the numbers of users on existing internet connections).

Codecs 
Blackbird has its own codecs for both video and audio. These use a form of adaptive coding to allow local variations in the type of data to be encoded efficiently.

Osprey 
Osprey supports loss-free video compression. Blackbird users can see broadcast quality video during editing (as well as proxy quality as has been the case with Blackbird's other codecs) and broadcasters can use the video output from Blackbird directly for transmission.

Blackbird 
The current Blackbird video codec is called Blackbird 9. It is designed for both editing and video streaming over variable speed broadband Internet connections. By varying the frame rate, it can provide consistent picture quality even on slow connections.

Like its predecessor Firebird (used in the FORlive system), the Blackbird codec allows real time compression and playback of video. This is important for handling the quantity of video in modern productions, as well as the reviewing, logging, editing and publishing features of Blackbird.

The Blackbird codec (formerly "Firebird") is a proprietary video codec developed by Forbidden Technologies and used by their flagship product, Blackbird (formerly "Forscene").

Blackbird is designed for both editing and video streaming over variable speed internet connections. Blackbird can provide consistent picture quality on slow connections by varying the frame rate through the use of tokens.  The tokens represent each source image which are scaled versions of each source image.

The Blackbird video codec facilitates a content-aware dynamic framerate. The codec can create a lightweight proxy, which can be used to deliver a live stream from an event.

Stephen Streater is the principle progenitor of the Blackbird video codec, which was released in 2004.

On 22 January 2017, Forbidden Technologies released the Blackbird 9 codec.

On 6 March 2018, MSG Networks received a New York chapter Emmy nomination for "Technical Achievement" as follows "MSG Networks Digital Video Editing & Digital Distribution via Blackbird Technology".

Impala 
The Blackbird audio codec is called Impala. Datarate and quality can be varied depending on the use: 10 kbit/s for modem web video and mobile playback, 30 kbit/s for audio only modem playback or broadband playback with video, and 80 kbit/s per channel for editing.

User interfaces 
Functionality to support production workflows, account management and media asset management is accessible from native mobile apps for Android and iOS, web and Java platforms. In 2017 a strategic migration to JavaScript was begun to deliver video playback and video editing capability to web browsers without additional programs or plugins.

Account management and MAM 
Accounts and users are separate. Many individuals may use the same Blackbird account and each user is assigned a role (manager, commenter, reviewer, logger, editor, storyboard). Admin/operational and MAM features include; transfer, search and playback of material, ingest configuration, workflow, account and user settings and usage reports.

Security 
Each standard user account has its own password-protected single sign-on web page.  Once logged on, the users have access to their own videos, library material, and any functionality their account supports.  Video is not stored on the local computer's hard disc, so when the user closes their web browser, their video is not accessible to subsequent users of the same computer.

Internet standards 
The Blackbird interfaces operate through Internet standards such as HTTP, JavaScript and Java, so can be used even in companies with severe firewalls. If web browsing works, then Blackbird almost always will too.

Publishing 
The Blackbird editing platform supports publishing from original sources up to 4K, to destinations including: social media and online video channels (e.g. YouTube, Facebook, Twitter), OTT and commercial cloud storage (e.g. S3, Azure). Video can be saved to a range of formats (e.g. MPEG, Ogg, XDCAM, EDL, HTML5, FCPX), still images (e.g. JPEG) and the proprietary Blackbird Player.

Timecode export 
Each frame of professionally shot video is tagged with a timecode which identifies it. Combining the timecode information of video handled within Blackbird at browse quality with the original broadcast quality video allows information in Blackbird to be transferred to a broadcast quality version. Videos logged or edited in Blackbird can be exported in the form of a simple EDL or more complex XML for autoconform and offline or online on an Avid or Final Cut Pro system.

Broadcast 
Videos which have been edited within Blackbird can be conformed/rendered to multiple outputs automatically at anything up to 3840p - full Ultra High Definition (UHD). At present 1080p HD accounts for the majority of production workflows. After editing Blackbird uploads the full quality frames used in the finished programme into the Cloud, or alternative eco-systems via Blackbird Edge. The special effects, captions, layers, graphics, cropping and stretching, colour correction and titles are combined at full resolution on a Blackbird Cloud for download, or Edge Server, ready for transmission. Material can be reviewed and edited from anywhere on the web, not just one local source.

Systems integration
Final programmes can be made, even in High-definition, and sent in broadcast quality efficiently to the broadcaster for transmission without using any third party editing systems. However Blackbird supports integration with third party systems, both in broadcast and elsewhere.

EDL/XML 
Blackbird supports Edit decision list/XML export to industry editing systems such as or Avid / Final Cut Pro. For example, creation of rough cuts in Blackbird can then be reliably conformed on Avid, even when they include clips which the Avid would not normally be able to ingest because of time code breaks and gaps.

SDI 
Serial Digital Interface improves Blackbird's integration into the high end broadcast environment. SDI support allows Blackbird to ingest source material in both Standard Definition (SD) and High Definition (HD) resolutions from any professional video source in real time. The SDI video input meets both Phase Alternating Line (PAL) and National Television System Committee (NTSC) standards.

Licensing 

The software is provided as a service (SAAS) which is charged by usage.

History 

Blackbird is a development from an editing system made by Eidos Interactive in the 1990s. This history starts from the first public showing of this product, at the International Broadcasting Convention in Europe in 1990.

See also 

Stephen B. Streater

Video editing
Video editing software
Comparison of video editing software

Web
Rich Internet application
Collaborative editor
Streaming media

Technology
JavaScript
Java (Sun)
Comparison of video codecs
Comparison of audio coding formats

Mobile related
Mobile phone features
Nokia N93
Nokia N95
Nokia N900

Other Online Editing Technologies
Jaycut
Jumpcut
WeVideo
photobucket
Grabyo
SnappyTV
Tellyo
Avid Media Composer

References

External links 

Third party reviews here and here

Film and video technology
Java platform software
Publishing software
Video editing software
Video hosting
Web applications
Web hosting